Dunajský Klátov is a village and municipality in the Dunajská Streda District in the Trnava Region of south-west Slovakia.

Geography
The municipality lies at an altitude of 114 metres and covers an area of 4.574 km². It has a population of about 456 people.

History
In the 9th century, the territory of Dunajský Klátov became part of the Kingdom of Hungary. In historical records the village was first mentioned in 1393. After the Austro-Hungarian army disintegrated in November 1918, Czechoslovak troops occupied the area, later acknowledged internationally by the Treaty of Trianon. Between 1938 and 1945 Dunajský Klátov once more became part of Miklós Horthy's Hungary through the First Vienna Award. From 1945 until the Velvet Divorce, it was part of Czechoslovakia. Since then it has been part of Slovakia.

See also
 List of municipalities and towns in Slovakia

References

Genealogical resources

The records for genealogical research are available at the state archive "Statny Archiv in Bratislava, Slovakia"
 Roman Catholic church records (births/marriages/deaths): 1673-1942 (parish B)
 Lutheran church records (births/marriages/deaths): 1823-1946 (parish B)
 Reformated church records (births/marriages/deaths): 1784-1926 (parish B)

External links
Surnames of living people in Dunajsky Klatov

Villages and municipalities in Dunajská Streda District
Hungarian communities in Slovakia